Maryland Deathfest (often abbreviated to MDF) is an annual American extreme metal music festival founded in 2003 by Ryan Taylor and Evan Harting. The festival is held in Baltimore, Maryland during Memorial Day weekend, and it features many bands from around the world that vary from a wide range of heavy metal subgenres. It is the biggest event of its kind in North America, attracting attendees from more than 40 U.S. states and 25 countries every year. More than 700 bands from more than 35 countries have played at MDF since 2003.

The concept of the event is "To bring to the world the best and most extreme bands the underground has to offer. Never conforming to trends, or being limited by genre restrictions, we want to showcase what extreme music, both new and old, is capable of."

Due to the COVID-19 pandemic, MDF was cancelled in 2020 and 2021, but returned on May 26-29, 2022.

Shortly before the 2022 festival, the organizers of MDF stated that the event would not happen in 2023. On August 2, 2022, it was announced that MDF will return for its 19th edition on May 23-26, 2024.

History and line-ups
Since 2003, MDF has featured over 750 bands from over 35 countries, many of which have made their US debut at the festival. The festival is promoted with the slogan: "America's biggest metal party of the year."

2003
The first installment of Maryland Deathfest was held from Friday, May 23 to Sunday, May 25 at the Thunderdome.

2004
Maryland Death Fest 2004 was held on Saturday, May 29 and Sunday, May 30 at the Thunderdome.

2005
Maryland Deathfest 2005 was held on Saturday, May 28 and Saturday, May 29 at the House of Rock.

2006
Maryland Deathfest IV was held on Saturday, May 27 and Sunday, May 28. This was the first Maryland Deathfest to be held at Sonar, which hosted every iteration of the festival from 2006 to 2012.

2007
Maryland Deathfest V was held on Saturday, May 26 and Sunday, May 27.

2008
Maryland Deathfest VI was held from Friday, May 23 to Sunday, May 25.

2009
Maryland Deathfest VII was held from Friday, May 22 to Sunday, May 24, and was the first incarnation of the festival to feature a second stage outside the venue.

2010
Maryland Deathfest VIII was held from Friday, May 28 to Sunday, May 30, with a pre-fest show taking place on Thursday, May 27.

2011
Maryland Deathfest IX was held from Thursday, May 26 to Sunday, May 29, 2011.

2012
Maryland Deathfest X was held from Thursday, May 24 to Sunday, May 27, 2012.

2013
Maryland Deathfest XI was held from Thursday, May 23 to Sunday, May 26, 2013. It was the first incarnation to feature the Baltimore Soundstage, a separate venue that catered primarily to grindcore, punk and hardcore acts. It was also the last incarnation of the festival to be hosted at the former Sonar Compound, following its sale and rebranding as the Paparazzi Nightclub.

2014
Maryland Deathfest XII was held from Thursday, May 22 to Sunday, May 25, 2014. The main stages were located at the Edison Lot in Baltimore, near the former Sonar location.  It is the second incarnation to feature the Baltimore Soundstage, again catering primarily to punk, grindcore and hardcore. It is the first year to feature additional bands at Rams Head Live!, which featured mainly black, death and doom metal.

2015
Maryland Deathfest XIII was held from Thursday, May 21 to Sunday, May 24, 2015. For the second time, both main stages were located at the Edison Lot in Baltimore, near the former Sonar location.  It is the third incarnation to feature the Baltimore Soundstage venue, again catering primarily to punk, grindcore and hardcore, and the second to feature additional bands at Rams Head Live!, again featuring mainly black, death and doom metal. Notably, both Triptykon and Ufomammut were scheduled to appear, after having dropped off of last year's bill. Mobb Deep's performance marked the first appearance of an act outside of heavy metal, hardcore or punk as part of the festival.

2016

References

External links
 
 

Heavy metal festivals in the United States
Music festivals in Maryland
Music festivals established in 2003
Festivals in Baltimore